Pierre-Barthélémy Portal d'Albarèdes, Baron Portal, (30 October 1765, Montauban (Albarèdes) – 11 January 1845, Bordeaux) was a French politician born into a Protestant family of Guienne.

Biography 
He created in 1789 a trading house, under the name Portal Larrode and Co..

He is a member of the Board of Trade (1801) and the Chamber of Commerce of Bordeaux at the beginning of its creation (1803). He was then Minister of Marine and Colonies (December 1818 – December 1821). He was a judge at the tribunal of commerce, mayor of Bordeaux, member for trade in Bordeaux to demand the restitution of goods seized by U.S. ships, appointed by Napoleon, master of requests in 1813, member of the Tarn-et-Garonne in 1818 Peer of France, regent of the bank of Bordeaux.

He was appointed hereditary baron by letters patent of 1818, Baron-hereditary peerage by letters of 1821.

The Musée des Beaux-Arts of Bordeaux keeps a bust of him by the sculptor, Dominique Fortune Maggese.

He is the brother of Paul Portal, president of the Chamber of Commerce of Bordeaux. His grandson, Count Stanislas d'Escayrac de Lauture, French explorer, wrote an interesting account of his travels.

1765 births
1845 deaths
People from Montauban
Ministers of Marine and the Colonies